The Etschtal, is the name given to a part of alpine valley of the Adige in Trentino-Alto Adige, Italy, which stretches from Merano to Bolzano and from Salorno to Rovereto. 

South of Rovereto, the valley's name changes to Vallagarina, but Val d'Adige is often used to define the whole river valley, up to its entrance into the Padan Plain.

The valley separates: at the top, the Alps (to the West) from the Dolomites (to the East); at the bottom the Pre-Alps and Lake Garda (to the West) from the Venetian pre-Alps (to the East).

Images

References
Alpenverein South Tyrol 

Valleys of South Tyrol